The men's 1000 metres race of the 2015–16 ISU Speed Skating World Cup 4, arranged in the Thialf arena in Heerenveen, Netherlands, was held on 12 December 2015.

Pavel Kulizhnikov of Russia won the race, while his compatriot Denis Yuskov came second, and Kjeld Nuis of the Netherlands came third. Jonathan Garcia of the United States won the Division B race.

Results
The race took place on Saturday, 12 December, with Division B scheduled in the morning session, at 10:31, and Division A scheduled in the afternoon session, at 17:18.

Division A

Division B

References

Men 1000
4